Albano Pera (born 13 February 1950) is an Italian sport shooter and Olympic medalist. He received a silver medal in Double Trap at the 1996 Summer Olympics in Atlanta He is European champion from 1988 (Trap), and received a silver medal in 1989.

References

External links

1950 births
Living people
Italian male sport shooters
Trap and double trap shooters
Shooters at the 1988 Summer Olympics
Shooters at the 1996 Summer Olympics
Olympic shooters of Italy
Olympic silver medalists for Italy
Olympic medalists in shooting
Medalists at the 1996 Summer Olympics
20th-century Italian people